Northern Lines Railway  is a shortline railroad operating  of track in and near St. Cloud in central Minnesota. The railroad was formed in 2004 to operate Burlington Northern Santa Fe trackage in and near the St. Cloud area and started operations in 2005. Interchange is made with BNSF in east St. Cloud or at the rail yard in central St. Cloud.

Lines
From the connection with BNSF in east St. Cloud Northern Lines Railway's mainline crosses the Mississippi River on the 1892 St. Cloud Rail Bridge, passes through the northern part of downtown St. Cloud, and reaches the large rail yard in central St. Cloud.

After the rail yard the line continues west into Waite Park where it splits. The St. Joseph branch continues westward, through the site of the longtime Great Northern car shops, through an industrial area, crosses the Sauk River and continues on to a industrial park in St. Joseph, approximately  beyond the split, where the line now ends. This line once extended through to Moorhead, Minnesota and the northernmost portion of the once through line continues to be operated by Otter Tail Valley Railroad.

The Rockville branch extends from the split in Waite Park southwestward and terminates in Rockville, approximately  beyond the split. In 2012, Archer Daniels Midland constructed a shuttle loading grain elevator on the Rockville line between Waite Park and Rockville, joining Wenner Gas's propane terminal (expanded in 2014) in Rockville and Martin Marietta Materials's aggregate quarry in Waite Park as customers on the line. This line once extended through to Willmar but was abandoned in the 1980's by BNSF.

In addition to the main line and the two branches the railroad serves several customers in east St. Cloud via trackage rights on BNSF track.

Traffic
As of 2021 traffic from approximately 20 customers consists mainly of aggregates, building products, chemicals, coal, food products, grain, lumber, manufactured goods, paper, propane, scrap, steel and stone. According to the railroad it handles approximately 10,500 carloads per year. 

The railroad is owned by Anacostia and Pacific Company, Inc and has its local headquarters in the old Great Northern depot at the rail yard in central St. Cloud.

Abandoned Trackage

However, in 2011 Northern Lines applied to discontinue  of service between Rockville and Cold Spring and in early 2012 track owner BNSF received permission to abandon the westernmost  of track and convert an additional  between Cold Spring and Rockville to industry track. Track was removed in Cold Spring and the last train, loaded with ties, left Cold Spring on August 22, 2012.

References 

 

Minnesota railroads
Switching and terminal railroads
Spin-offs of the BNSF Railway